Emden (F266) is the seventh ship of the Braunschweig-class corvette of the German Navy.

Developments 

The K130 Braunschweig class (sometimes Korvette 130) is Germany's newest class of ocean-going corvettes.

They feature reduced radar and infrared signatures ("stealth" beyond the s) and will be equipped with two helicopter UAVs for remote sensing. Recently, the German Navy ordered a first batch of two UMS Skeldar V-200 systems for the use on the Braunschweig-class corvettes. The hangar is too small for standard helicopters, but the pad is large enough for Sea Kings, Lynx, or NH-90s, the helicopters of the German Navy.

The German Navy has ordered the RBS-15 Mk4 in advance, which will be a future development of the Mk3 with increased range —— and a dual seeker for increased resistance to electronic countermeasures. The RBS-15 Mk3 has the capability to engage land targets.

In October 2016 it was announced that a second batch of five more frigates is to be procured from 2022 to 2025. The decision was in response to NATO requirements expecting Germany to provide a total of four corvettes at the highest readiness level for littoral operations by 2018, and with only five corvettes just two can be provided.

In September 2017, the German Navy commissioned the construction of five more corvettes in a consortium of North German shipyards. Lürssen will be the main contractor in the production of the vessels. The contract is worth around 2 billion euros. In April 2018, the German government announced the specific arrangements under which the five new K130s would be built.

Construction and career 
Emden's construction started in late 2019 and later laid down on 30 January 2020 by Lürssen-Werft in Bremen. Her forecastle was built by Blohm+Voss and towed to Bremen to be assembled. She had been expected to be commissioned in 2025. However, in September 2022 it was reported that increasing difficulties in integrating the command and control systems for the Batch 2 ships had resulted in a cost growth of 401 million Euros and at least a two year delay for the completion of the lead Batch 2 vessel, and potentially cascading delays for the next two ships in the Batch 2 program (including Emden) as well.

On 13 October 2020, she started being towed to Hamburg for assembly with her aft section. She arrived on 17 at Hamburg and on 21 of the same month her assembly started to take place.

References 

Corvettes
Stealth ships
Braunschweig-class corvettes